Motordrome may refer to:
Board track racing venues
Wall of death
Motordrome (album), a 2022 album by MØ

Places in Australia
Motordrome (Melbourne), a former sports venue

Places in the United States
Motordrome, California, a former streetcar stop and archaic placename in Los Angeles County
Newark Motordrome in Newark, New Jersey
Brighton Beach Motordrome in Brighton Beach, New York